Neil Courtney (born 13 September 1956) is an English former rugby union and professional rugby league footballer who played in the 1970s and 1980s.

Background
Neil Courtney was born in Leigh, Lancashire, England.

Playing career

International honours
Neil Courtney won a cap for Great Britain (RL) while at Warrington in 1982 against Australia (interchange/substitute).

Challenge Cup Final appearances
Neil Courtney played left-, i.e. number 8, in Wigan's 28-24 victory over Hull F.C. in the 1985 Challenge Cup Final during the 1984–85 season at Wembley Stadium, London on Saturday 4 May 1985.

County Cup Final appearances
Neil Courtney played left-, i.e. number 8, in Warrington's 26-10 victory over Wigan in the 1980 Lancashire County Cup Final during the 1980–81 season at Knowsley Road, St. Helens, on Saturday 4 October 1980, played left- in the 16-0 victory over St. Helens in the 1982 Lancashire County Cup Final during the 1982–83 season at Central Park, Wigan on Saturday 23 October 1982, and played left- in Wigan's 18-26 defeat by St. Helens in the 1984 Lancashire County Cup Final during the 1984–85 season at Central Park, Wigan on Sunday 28 October 1984.

John Player Trophy Final appearances
Neil Courtney played left-, i.e. number 8, in Warrington's 12-5 victory over Barrow in the 1980–81 John Player Trophy Final during the 1980–81 season at Central Park, Wigan on Saturday 24 January 1981.

Club career
Neil Courtney signed for St. Helens on 21 November 1974, he made his début for St. Helens as an interchange/substitute in the 10-9 victory over York at Clarence Street, York on Sunday 6 April 1975, he made his starting début for St. Helens in the 22-31 defeat by Wales in the testimonial friendly at Knowsley Road, St. Helens on Sunday 20 April 1975, he made his competitive starting début for St. Helens in the 15-29 defeat by Featherstone Rovers at Post Office Road, Featherstone on Sunday 5 October 1975, he played his last match for St. Helens in the 21-25 defeat by Salford at The Willows, Salford on Friday 7 September 1979, he made his début for Warrington on Wednesday 26 September 1979, and he played his last match for Warrington on Sunday 9 October 1983, he made his début for Wigan as an interchange/substitute in the 10-22 defeat by Fulham RLFC at Craven Cottage, Fulham on 19 February 1984, he scored his only try for Wigan in the 18-36 defeat by Leeds at Headingley Rugby Stadium, Leeds on 31 March 1985, and he played his last match for Wigan as an interchange/substitute in the 14-8 victory over New Zealand in the 1985 New Zealand tour of England and France match at Central Park, Wigan on 6 October 1985.

References

External links
!Great Britain Statistics at englandrl.co.uk (statistics currently missing due to not having appeared for both Great Britain, and England)
Statistics at wigan.rlfans.com
Statistics at wolvesplayers.thisiswarrington.co.uk
Profile at saints.org.uk

1956 births
Living people
English rugby league players
English rugby union players
Great Britain national rugby league team players
Rugby league players from Leigh, Greater Manchester
Rugby league props
Rugby league second-rows
Rugby union players from Leigh, Greater Manchester
St Helens R.F.C. players
Warrington Wolves players
Wigan Warriors players